Boris Vladimirovich Vengerovsky (born 15 September 1931, Moscow) is a Russian and Soviet sound engineer. Laureate of the State Prize of the USSR (1985). Laureate of the Nika Award (1990). Honored Artist of Russia (1997).

Biography 
He was born in 1931 in Moscow. Since 1953   at the film studio Mosfilm. He worked as a microphone, assistant sound engineer, since 1964  a sound engineer.

Participated in the creation of films Triumph Over Violence and And Yet I Believe... directed by Mikhail Romm. He worked with Elem Klimov, Sergei Solovyov, Daniil Khrabrovitsky, Nikolai Dostal and others.

Closely collaborated with the directors Alov and Naumov. For his work in the film The Coast was awarded the State Prize of the USSR. And in 1998 he was nominated for the  Nika Award for the best work of the sound engineer for his work in the film Choice.

In 1990 he became a laureate of the award Nika Award for his work in Nikolai Skuibin's film Homeless. Without a Fixed Place of Residence.

In our time, is engaged in dubbing foreign films.

Personal life 
Was married to actress Tatyana Konyukhova.

Son  Vladimir Vengerovsky (1961-2010), the sound engineer at the film studio Mosfilm.

Selected filmography 
 Triumph Over Violence (1965)
 July Rain (1966)
 Sofiya Perovskaya (1967)
 Agony (1974)
 Farewell (1983)

References

External links
 KM.RU — информационный мультипортал
 Борис Криштул. Кинопродюсер

1931 births
Living people
Mass media people from Moscow
Academicians of the Russian Academy of Cinema Arts and Sciences "Nika"
Russian audio engineers
Recipients of the USSR State Prize
Recipients of the Nika Award